Lactobacillus acetotolerans (New Latin 'vinegar-tolerating milk-bacillus') is a species of gram positive bacteria in the genus Lactobacillus. Discovered in rice wine vinegar, it has a very high tolerance for acetic acid. It can tolerate an acetic acid concentration of over 9% and a pH as low as 3.3. It is known to produce sour flavors in beer it invades, by producing lactic acid.

References

External links
Type strain of Lactobacillus acetotolerans at BacDive -  the Bacterial Diversity Metadatabase

Lactobacillaceae
Bacteria described in 1986